The Phillip Island Grand Prix Circuit is a motor racing circuit located near Ventnor, on Phillip Island, Victoria, Australia. The current circuit was first used in 1956.

History

Road circuit
Motor racing on Phillip Island began in 1928 with the running of the 100 Miles Road Race, an event which has since become known as the first Australian Grand Prix. It utilised a high speed rectangle of local closed-off public roads with four similar right hand corners. The circuit was the venue for the Australian Grand Prix through to 1935 and it was used for the last time on 6 May 1935 for the Jubilee Day Races.

A new  triangular circuit utilising the pit straight from the original rectangular course was subsequently mapped out and first used for the Australian Race Drivers' Cup on 5 November 1935. The final car event on the circuit was held on Cup Day (1 November) 1938 and the final motorcycle race meeting was conducted on 30 January 1940.

Significant events staged at the Phillip Island road circuit included:
 1928 100 Miles Road Race
 1929 Australian Grand Prix
 1930 Australian Grand Prix
 1931 Australian Grand Prix
 1932 Australian Grand Prix
 1933 Australian Grand Prix
 1934 Phillip Island 100
 1934 Australian Grand Prix
 1934 Winter 100
 1934 Victorian Centenary Grand Prix
 1935 Centenary 300
 1935 Australian Grand Prix
 1935 Jubilee Handicap
 1935 Winter 100
 1935 Australian Race Drivers' Cup
 1936 Victorian Sporting Car Club Trophy
 1936 Australian Tourist Trophy
 1937 Phillip Island Trophy
 1938 Phillip Island Grand Prix

Grand Prix circuit

1956–1962
In 1951, a group of six local businessmen decided to build a new track. As the piece of available land was on the edge of the coast, the track is known for its steep grades – the highest 57 metres – which caused cost overruns and delays in track opening. The new track was opened in 1956 and in 1960 the first Armstrong 500 production car race was held at the circuit. Extensive damage resulted from the running of the 1962 Armstrong 500, and, with the circuit owners unable to finance repairs, the circuit was closed and the race was moved to the Mount Panorama Circuit at Bathurst in New South Wales, to eventually become known as the Bathurst 1000.

1967–1978
The circuit reopened in October 1967 and hosted the Phillip Island 500 endurance race, a round of the Australian Manufacturers' Championship, from 1971 to 1977. The race was also a round of the Australian Touring Car Championship in 1976 and 1977. But again, due to its testing terrain, the circuit required significant maintenance and slowly declined through the 1970s. It was farmed by its owners while closed and was then sold in 1985 in preparation for reopening, but did not do so until 1988 after agreement on a long-term lease and rebuild agreement. During the time the circuit deteriorated and finally closed, part of the main problem for its owners was that the Phillip Island Bridge from the island to the Australian mainland reportedly could not carry the heavy vehicles needed to resurface the circuit. This meant that the bitumen surface was a cold mix which easily broke up under the rigours of racing, instead of the standard hot mix which would have allowed a more durable surface. It would not be until the mid-1980s that the bridge would be rebuilt allowing the necessary equipment needed for resurfacing.

1988–present

In 1989, the Australian Motorcycle Grand Prix joined the FIM Road Racing World Championship calendar for the first time, and was held at Phillip Island. The 1989 race saw a race long dice in the 500 cc division between local favourites Wayne Gardner and Kevin Magee, along with Wayne Rainey and Christian Sarron. The race was won by 1987 World Champion Gardner to the delight of the huge crowd. Gardner would make it two in a row at the Island in 1990 before the race moved to Eastern Creek in Sydney for 1991. The Australian Motorcycle Grand Prix would remain at Eastern Creek until it returned permanently to Phillip Island from 1997 onwards.

Phillip Island hosted its first Superbike World Championship round in 1990, taking over from Sydney's Oran Park Raceway as the Australian round of the series. Local riders Peter Goddard (Yamaha FZR750) and Rob Phillis (Kawasaki ZXR750) won the two races for what was Round 12 of the season, with Goddard having secured pole position. The World Superbike round continues to be held annually at Phillip Island to this day.

In 1990, the Australian Touring Car Championship (ATCC) returned to the circuit for the first time since 1977, this time as a sprint round. Dick Johnson won the round in his Ford Sierra RS500, in what was to be his final ever round victory. The event was not held in 1991 or 1992, but was reinstated to the calendar in 1993, with the sprint format then continuing every year until 2004. By then, the ATCC was known as V8 Supercars. After not appearing on the calendar in 2004, from 2005 to 2007, Phillip Island hosted the Grand Finale; the final round of the V8 Supercars season. In each year, the event decided that year's champion, including in controversial circumstances in 2006. From 2008 to 2011, Phillip Island returned to hosting a 500 km race, this time known for sponsorship reasons as the L&H 500. The Phillip Island 500 replaced Sandown's Sandown 500 as the annual V8 Supercar 500 km race, an event which was later reinstated for 2012. Since then, Phillip Island has returned to hosting a sprint round of the championship, which has become known as the Phillip Island Super Sprint.

The Australian Motorcycle Grand Prix has always been more of a promoter event than a profit-raiser in itself. The contract was prolonged until 2026, although tobacco advertising has been banned since 2007.

Important dates
 1951: A historically significant meeting of six local businessmen decided to re-establish motor racing at Phillip Island.
 1952: A steering committee formed and the Phillip Island Auto Racing Club (PIARC) developed with a dream "to build Australia's first international grand prix circuit".The current site was purchased in that year. PIARC calls for 7000 subscriptions at 10 pounds each to assist in the development of the circuit and building work begins. An Alfa was used to measure the three-mile distance required for international certification as an International Circuit.
 1956: Between 1952 and 1956 the building of the circuit had met with major engineering hurdles and PIARC had to call for more money from its shareholders. The grand open meeting was held with much acclaim in December 1956.
 1957: Phillip Island stages numerous trophy races including the Australian Motorsport Magazine Trophy Race 1957, the Formula Libre race of 1958 and the Phillip Island Trophy race of 1958.
 1960: The inaugural Armstrong 500 endurance race is won by Frank Coad and John Roxburgh driving a Vauxhall Cresta. They completed the race in 8 hours 15 minutes.
 1962: The circuit is damaged during the running of the 1962 Armstrong 500 and is subsequently closed to racing.
 1964: Businessman and former Australian Drivers' Champion Len Lukey purchases the circuit with a view to redevelopment. Today, a corner on the circuit is named after Lukey.    
 1967: The circuit reopens with a newly laid surface at the "Grand Re-Opening Meeting" on 22 October 1967. 
 1971: The first Phillip Island 500K endurance race is held
 1978: The circuit is closed, having become virtually unusable for modern racing and, between 1979 and 1982, it is used only for historic rallies and cub sprints. 
 1985: Phillip Island Circuit purchased by Placetac Pty Ltd, with the view to re-introducing racing to the famous facility.
 1988: The circuit is refurbished with a reduced length of 4.449 kilometres and is reopened on 4 December 1988 for the final round of the 1988 Swann Insurance International Series for motorcycles.
 1989: The 1989 Australian motorcycle Grand Prix, the first World Championship round in Australia, is held at the circuit on 9 April.   

 1990: Phillip Island hosts its first round of the Superbike World Championship. The circuit also hosts its first sprint round of the Australian Touring Car Championship.
 1996: Australian superbike rider, Troy Corser, wins the Superbike World Championship on board a Ducati at the October race at Phillip Island. 
 1997: The Australian motorcycle Grand Prix returns to Phillip Island, where it becomes a permanent fixture.
 1998: Australian Michael Doohan wins the motorcycle Grand Prix. The first corner is named after him.
 2000: Simon Wills sets a longstanding outright lap record of the circuit in the Formula Holden category. 
 2004: The circuit and surrounding land is purchased by the Linfox corporation with a view to complement the circuit with facilities such as an 18-hole Greg Norman-designed golf course and a 5-star hotel.
 2006: A multimillion-dollar re-development was undertaken in late 2006 by the Linfox Group, including the construction of a new karting circuit.
 2008: The Phillip Island 500 is run for the first time since 1977, this time for V8 Supercars. The race is held four times before once again becoming defunct. 
 2012: Australian Casey Stoner wins his sixth consecutive Australian Motorcycle Grand Prix, as well as his last career Grand Prix victory. Before the race, the third corner of the circuit is named after Stoner. 
 2014: Jamie Whincup becomes the first ever driver to win a sixth ATCC/V8 Supercars title by winning the second Saturday race at the Plus Fitness Phillip Island 400.

Events

 Current
 February: Australian Superbike Championship
 March: GT World Challenge Australia, S5000 Australian Drivers' Championship, TCR Australia Touring Car Series, Trans Am Series Australia, Phillip Island Classic
 August: National Festival of Superkarts
 September: HSRCA Spring Festival
 October: MotoGP Australian motorcycle Grand Prix
 November: Superbike World Championship, Australian Superbike Championship, Island Magic

 Former

 Armstrong 500 (1960–1962)
 FIM Endurance World Championship (1991–1992)
 Sidecar World Championship (1999–2000)
 Supercars Championship Phillip Island 500 (2008–2011, 2017–2018)
 Supercars Championship Phillip Island SuperSprint (1976–1977, 1990, 1993–2003, 2005–2007, 2009, 2012–2016, 2019)

Lap records

In the early 1990s, Phillip Island was used during the Australian summer for pre-season testing by various World Sportscar Championship teams and some Japanese Formula 3000 teams (who generally found travelling to Australia was actually cheaper than paying some $5,000 per hour to hire the Honda owned Suzuka Circuit in Japan). While no official lap times were published, television commentator and race driver Neil Crompton reported in 1990 that the Nissan Motorsports International team with drivers Julian Bailey and Mark Blundell driving the Nissan R90C were able to lap the circuit in around 1:18 while a 3.0 Litre Mugen V8 powered Dome F3000 (which Crompton drove) was able record similar lap times. At the time the fastest Australian cars that raced at Phillip Island were the 3.8 Litre V6 powered Formula Holdens which were approximately 10 seconds per lap slower.

In late October 2018 Mathew Radisich drove his 2011 ex-Conquest Racing IndyCar during testing at Phillip Island as a part of unofficial practice day, with images distributed online of his recorded Cosworth data showing a lap time of 1:17.005. However, as this time was not set during a race meeting, it does not count as an official lap record.

As of October 2022, the official race lap records at Phillip Island Grand Prix Circuit are listed as:

Notes

References

Further reading
"The Official 50 Race History of the Australian Grand Prix"

External links

Phillip Island Grand Prix Circuit

Superbike World Championship circuits
Motorsport venues in Victoria (Australia)
Grand Prix motorcycle circuits
Kart circuits
Supercars Championship circuits
Motorsport at Phillip Island
Sports venues in Victoria (Australia)
Australian Grand Prix